The Men's team tennis competition at the 2010 Asian Games saw South Korea try to defend the title but lost in the quarterfinals to Uzbekistan. Each tie consists of two singles and one doubles match.

Schedule
All times are China Standard Time (UTC+08:00)

Results

Bracket

Final

Top half

Bottom half

1st round

2nd round

Quarterfinals

Semifinals

Final

Non-participating athletes

References
Draw

Tennis at the 2010 Asian Games